Daichi may refer to:
 Daichi, Kermanshah
 Daichi, Lorestan